Lian River may refer to these rivers in China:

 Lian River (South China Sea), a river in eastern Guangdong which flows into the South China Sea
 Lian River (Bei River tributary), a river in northwestern Guangdong, the largest tributary of Bei River
 Lian River (Yunnan), a tributary of Qu River in Yunan Province
 Lianshui River or Lian River, one of the largest tributaries of Xiang River in Hunan Province